Ludwig Schlanger (22 December 1904 – 16 February 2001) was an Austrian wrestler. He competed in the men's Greco-Roman featherweight at the 1928 Summer Olympics.

References

1904 births
2001 deaths
Austrian male sport wrestlers
Olympic wrestlers of Austria
Wrestlers at the 1928 Summer Olympics
Sportspeople from Novi Sad